2016 Heinemann, provisional designation , is a carbonaceous Themistian asteroid from the outer regions of the asteroid belt, approximately 22 kilometers in diameter. It was discovered on 18 September 1938, by German astronomer Alfred Bohrmann at Heidelberg Observatory in southwest Germany, and later named after ARI-astronomer Karl Heinemann (1898–1970).

Orbit and classification 

Heinemann is a member of the Themis family, a dynamical family of carbonaceous asteroids with nearly coplanar ecliptical orbits, located in the outer-belt main. It orbits the Sun at a distance of 2.5–3.7 AU once every 5 years and 6 months (2,022 days). Its orbit has an eccentricity of 0.19 and an inclination of 1° with respect to the ecliptic.

Physical characteristics

Rotation period 

In October 2016, a rotational lightcurve of Heinemann was obtained from photometric observations by French astronomer Matthieu Conjat. Lightcurve analysis gave a rotation period of 22.96 hours with a brightness variation of 0.36 magnitude.

Diameter and albedo 

According to the surveys carried out by the Japanese Akari satellite and NASA's Wide-field Infrared Survey Explorer with its subsequent NEOWISE mission, Heinemann measures between 22.435 and 25.52 kilometers in diameter and its surface has an albedo between 0.058 and 0.0944.

The Collaborative Asteroid Lightcurve Link derives an albedo of 0.0653 and a diameter of 21.68 kilometers based on an absolute magnitude of 11.9.

Naming 

This minor planet was named after Karl Heinemann (1898–1970), German astronomer and long-time staff member at the Astronomisches Rechen-Institut. His activities included spherical astronomy and the editing of the "Astronomischer Jahresbericht" during 1934–1958.

The official  was published by the Minor Planet Center on 15 October 1977.

References

External links 
 Matthieu Conjat, homepage
 Asteroid Lightcurve Database (LCDB), query form (info )
 Dictionary of Minor Planet Names, Google books
 Asteroids and comets rotation curves, CdR – Observatoire de Genève, Raoul Behrend
 Discovery Circumstances: Numbered Minor Planets (1)-(5000) – Minor Planet Center
 
 

002016
Discoveries by Alfred Bohrmann
Named minor planets
19380918